
Gmina Ostrów Wielkopolski is a rural gmina (administrative district) in Ostrów Wielkopolski County, Greater Poland Voivodeship, in west-central Poland. Its seat is the town of Ostrów Wielkopolski, although the town is not part of the territory of the gmina.

Villages
Gmina Ostrów Wielkopolski contains the villages and settlements of Baby, Będzieszyn, Biłgoraje, Biniew, Borowiec, Cegły, Chruszczyny, Czekanów, Daniszyn, Fabryka, Franklinów, Górzenko, Górzno, Gorzyce Wielkie, Gutów, Kąkolewo, Karski, Kołątajew, Kwiatków, Łąkociny, Lamki, Lewków, Lewkowiec, Mazury, Młynów, Nowe Kamienice, Onęber, Radziwiłłów, Sadowie, Słaborowice, Smardowskie Olendry, Sobczyn, Sobótka, Stary Staw, Świeligów, Szczury, Topola Mała, Trąba, Warszty, Wtórek, Wysocko Wielkie, Zacharzew and Zalesie.

Neighbouring gminas
Gmina Ostrów Wielkopolski is bordered by the gminas of Gołuchów, Krotoszyn, Nowe Skalmierzyce, Odolanów, Pleszew, Przygodzice, Raszków and Sieroszewice.

References
 Polish official population figures 2006

Ostrow Wielkopolski
Ostrów Wielkopolski County